There are over 600 scheduled monuments in Cheshire, dating from pre-history to the present.

For ease of reference these are split into three lists by period:
List of scheduled monuments in Cheshire dated to before 1066
List of scheduled monuments in Cheshire (1066–1539)
List of scheduled monuments in Cheshire since 1539